Poomaname Vaa is a 1999 Tamil-language romantic drama film written and directed by V. Azhagappan. The film stars Ramarajan and Sangita, while Easwari Rao and Manivannan portrayed supporting roles. The music for the film was composed by Sirpy and the film opened across Tamil Nadu in April 1999.

Cast

Ramarajan
Sangita
Easwari Rao
Manivannan
Kavitha
Vadivelu
Ranjith
Vinu Chakravarthy
Senthil
Alex
Pandu
Halwa Vasu
MLA Thangaraj
Editor Sreedhar
Melur Govindhan
Vasu Vikram
Gajapathi

Production
The film was produced under the banner of Nalini Cine Arts by Ramarajan's wife Nalini Ramarajan. During production, the film was labelled as the actor's 40th film and 11th film as a director, but V. Azhagappan was later given the post. The initial cast included other actors such as Chandrasekhar, Manorama and Santhana Bharathi, who eventually did not feature.

Release
Like many of Ramarajan's films in the late 1990s, Poomaname Vaa and Annan had a delayed release, while films such as Sathya Thaai with Suvaluxmi, Thambikku Thaai Manasu with Sanghavi and Kannuppada Povvudhu were cancelled midway through shoot.

A reviewer from The Hindu noted "The usual zest is missing in Ramarajan. He however manages to fulfil his task. Sangeetha, a capable performer, is out of touch, her repeat expressions not helping her role. The comedy is more for the front benchers".

Soundtrack
The film's music was composed by Sirpy.

References

1999 films
1990s Tamil-language films
Films scored by Vidyasagar
Films directed by V. Azhagappan